Mednogorsk is a town in Orenburg Oblast, Russia. Population:

History
Settlements at the area were founded in 1933 and the town status was granted in 1939.

Administrative and municipal status
Within the framework of administrative divisions, it is, together with six rural localities, incorporated as the Town of Mednogorsk—an administrative unit with the status equal to that of the districts. As a municipal division, the Town of Mednogorsk is incorporated as Mednogorsk Urban Okrug.

References

Notes

Sources

Cities and towns in Orenburg Oblast
Cities and towns built in the Soviet Union
Populated places established in 1933